Matthew Wood may refer to:

Sportspeople
Sir Matthew Wood, 4th Baronet (1857–1908), English cricketer
Matthew Wood (rugby league) (born 1969), Australian rugby league footballer
Matthew Wood (cricketer, born 1977), English cricketer with Glamorgan CCC
Matthew Wood (cricketer, born 1980), English cricketer with Nottinghamshire, previously played for Somerset
Matthew Wood (cricketer, born 1985), English cricketer

Others
Matthew Wood (sound editor) (born 1972), American sound editor and voice actor
Sir Matthew Wood, 1st Baronet (1768–1843), MP and Lord Mayor of London
Wood (musician) (Matthew Wood, born 1979), drummer with British Sea Power
Matthew W. Wood (1879–1969), farmer and political figure on Prince Edward Island
Matt Wood, who stars on the instructional DVDs of his brother Peter K. Wood, magician
Matthew Wood, killed in the January 2013 Vauxhall helicopter crash

See also
Matt Woods (1931-2014), English footballer
Matt Woods (footballer, born 1976), English footballer